is a 1988 Japanese comedy film directed by Tomio Kuriyama. It was released on 24 December 1988. It is the first film in Tsuribaka Nisshi series. Most of this series are released as one of double feature such as Otoko wa Tsurai yo.

The film focuses on salaryman Densuke Hamasaki (a.k.a. Hama-chan), whom his supervisor Sasaki has dubbed the "Fishing Baka" because of his passion for fishing.

Cast
 Toshiyuki Nishida as Densuke Hamasaki
 Rentarō Mikuni as Ichinosuke Suzuki
 Eri Ishida as Michiko Hamasaki
 Kei Tani
 Mami Yamase
 Akira Nagoya as Noguchi

Awards
 17th Japan Academy Prize: Best Actor - Rentarō Mikuni

References

External links
 

1988 films
Films directed by Tomio Kuriyama
1980s Japanese-language films
Tsuribaka Nisshi
Shochiku films
1980s Japanese films

ja:釣りバカ日誌